Skórzyn may refer to the following places in Poland:
Skórzyn, Lower Silesian Voivodeship (south-west Poland)
Skórzyn, Lubusz Voivodeship (west Poland)